Amos Jay Cummings (May 15, 1841 – May 2, 1902) was an American newspaperman, Civil War veteran, and politician who served as a United States Representative from New York from 1889 to 1894, and from 1895 to 1902.

He was a recipient of the United States military's highest decoration, the Medal of Honor.

Biography
Born in Conklin, New York, Cummings attended the common schools before being apprenticed to the printing trade at age twelve.

Cummings claimed he was with William Walker in his last invasion of Nicaragua in October 1858, but this is disputed by Cummings' biographer.

During the Civil War, Cummings enlisted in the Army at Irvington, New Jersey, in September 1862 and served as a Sergeant Major in the 26th New Jersey Volunteer Infantry Regiment. He earned the Medal of Honor on May 4, 1863, at Salem Heights, Virginia. His official citation reads: "Rendered great assistance in the heat of the action in rescuing a part of the field batteries from an extremely dangerous and exposed position." His medal was not awarded until several decades later, on March 28, 1894. He was mustered out in June 1863.

Journalism 
After his military service, Cummings filled editorial positions for the New York Tribune under Horace Greeley. He later worked for The New York Sun and the New York Express. He published a series of popular travel accounts of Florida and the American West for The New York Sun.

Congress 
Cummings was elected as a Democrat to the 50th Congress (March 4, 1887 – March 3, 1889). He declined renomination in 1888, but was subsequently elected to the 51st Congress to fill the vacancy caused by the death of Samuel S. Cox. He was reelected to the 52nd and 53rd Congresses and served from November 5, 1889, to November 21, 1894, when he resigned. He served as chairman of the Committee on Naval Affairs during the 53rd Congress.

Cummings was elected to the 54th Congress to fill the vacancy caused by the death of Representative-elect Andrew J. Campbell. He was reelected to the 55th, 56th, and 57th Congresses and served from November 5, 1895, until his death in Baltimore, Maryland, on May 2, 1902.

He was interred in Clinton Cemetery in Irvington, New Jersey.

Medal of Honor citation
Rank and organization: Sergeant Major, 26th New Jersey Infantry. Place and date: At Salem Heights, Va., 4 May 1863. Entered service at: Irvington, N.J. Born: 15 May 1841, Conklin, N.Y. Date of issue. 28 March 1894.

Citation:

Rendered great assistance in the heat of the action in rescuing a part of the field batteries from an extremely dangerous and exposed position.

See also

List of American Civil War Medal of Honor recipients: A–F
List of United States Congress members who died in office (1900–49)

Notes

References

 Retrieved on January 30, 2008

External links
 
 Memorial addresses on the life and character of Amos J. Cummings, late a representative from New York delivered in the House of Representatives and Senate frontispiece 1902	
Archival material by or about Amos J. Cummings

1841 births
1902 deaths
United States Army Medal of Honor recipients
Union Army soldiers
American Civil War recipients of the Medal of Honor
Democratic Party members of the United States House of Representatives from New York (state)
19th-century American politicians
20th-century American politicians